Los Angeles Metro Bus is the transit bus service in Los Angeles County, California operated by the Los Angeles County Metropolitan Transportation Authority (Metro).

, there are 113 routes in the system. Metro employs the drivers that operate most routes, but some are contracted out to MV Transportation, Southland Transit, and Transdev.

The Los Angeles Metro bus has the third largest fleet in North America, with 2,320 buses, about 80 percent are standard length ( or longer) and 17 percent are high-capacity  articulated buses.

History 

The Metro Bus brand dates back to the 1993 founding of Metro, but many of the routes in the system are little changed from the bus routes of the prior Southern California Rapid Transit District (RTD) or the streetcar routes operated by the Pacific Electric Red Cars or the Los Angeles Railway Yellow Cars.

Starting in 2003, Metro operated its bus network under three different brands: orange Metro Local buses for traditional routes, red Metro Rapid buses for limited stop routes, and blue Metro Express buses for minimal stop services along the region's extensive freeway network. The separate brands were retired in 2020 as part of Metro's NextGen Bus Plan, a major restructuring of the agencies routes, with most of the Metro Rapid routes retired in favor of more frequent service on the former Metro Local routes, which will now make fewer stops.

Routes 
Metro buses are given line numbers that indicate the type of service offered. This method was devised originally by the Southern California Rapid Transit District, Metro's predecessor.

 Line numbers lower than 100 are local routes to/from Downtown Los Angeles
 Line numbers in the 100s are local east/west routes in other areas
 Line numbers in the 200s are local north/south routes in other areas
 Line numbers in the 300s are limited-stop routes
 Line numbers in the 400s are freeway express routes to/from Downtown Los Angeles
 Line numbers in the 500s are freeway express routes in other areas
 Line numbers in the 600s are shuttle/circulator routes
 Line numbers in the 700s are limited-stop rapid routes.
 Line numbers in the 800s are used to designate Metro Rail routes as well as supplementary shuttles for suspended rail service.
 Line numbers in the 900s are Metro Busway routes.

1-99 (Local routes to/from Downtown Los Angeles) 
Local bus service to/from Downtown Los Angeles and other areas. The line numbering begins at line 2 (Sunset Bl, a line leading west from downtown) and proceeds counterclockwise around Downtown Los Angeles, ending at line 96 (Riverside Dr.)

100s (Local east/west routes in other areas) 
East/west service, not necessarily serving Downtown Los Angeles.

200s (Local north/south routes in other areas) 
North/south service, not necessarily serving Downtown Los Angeles.

300s (Limited-stop routes) 
After December 13, 2020, most Metro Limited Routes except Line 344 were discontinued, due to low ridership amid the COVID-19 pandemic.

400s (Freeway express routes to/from Downtown Los Angeles)

500s (Freeway express routes in other areas)

600s (Shuttles/circulators) 
Shuttles, special routes and local service within one or two adjacent neighborhoods.

700s (Rapid limited-stop routes)

800s (Metro Rail Shuttle)

900s (Metro Busway)

Fleet 

 Metro operates 2,320 buses in revenue service, the third-largest fleet in North America behind New York City's Metropolitan Transportation Authority (5,825) and New Jersey's NJ Transit (3,003). Metro operates the nation's largest fleet of compressed natural gas powered buses.

Photos

See also 
List of former Metro Local routes
List of former Metro Rapid routes
List of former Metro Express routes

Notes

References 

Los Angeles County Metropolitan Transportation Authority
 Metro Local
Metro Local
Metro Local